Enneapterygius clea, or Clea's triplefin, is a species of threefin blenny in the genus Enneapterygius, described by German ichthyologist Ronald Fricke in 1997. It is endemic to Queensland, Australia.

Etymology
Enneapterygius clea was described by Ronald Fricke in 1997, from a male holotype (AMS I.22600-056) and 34 paratype specimens. He gave the blenny its species epithet, "clea", and its common name in honour of his daughter Clea, then seven years old.

Description
Fricke described Enneapterygius clea as a medium-sized member of the Enneapterygius hemimelas species group, and considered it to be most closely related to the blacktail triplefin (Enneapterygius bahasa) and the redtail triplefin (Enneapterygius rubicauda), both from the western Pacific Ocean. Clea's triplefins have yellow-orange bodies with red streaks, orange vertical fins and blue-gray eyes. Males have black heads and tails, while the females do not share this feature. Male Clea's triplefins can reach a maximum length of 3.2 centimetres.

Distribution
The Clea's triplefin is a tropical blenny, endemic to reefs around Queensland, Australia, in the western central Pacific Ocean. It swims at a depth range of 4–24 metres.

References

External links
 Enneapterygius clea at www.fishwise.co.za
 Enneapterygius clea at World Register of Marine Species
 Enneapterygius clea at Encyclopedia of Life
 Enneapterygius clea at ITIS

clea
Fauna of Queensland
Marine fish of Eastern Australia
Endemic fauna of Australia
Fish described in 1997